Halfway House is a census-designated place (CDP) in Montgomery County, Pennsylvania, United States. The population was 2,881 at the 2010 census.

Geography
Halfway House is located at  (40.274479, -75.639118).

It is located north of Pottstown on Route 100 and is served by the Pottsgrove School District and the Pottstown post office with the zip code of 19464.

Demographics

As of the 2010 census, the CDP was 84.6% Non-Hispanic White, 8.1% Black or African American, 0.2% Native American and Alaskan Native, 2.8% Asian, 0.1% Native Hawaiian and Other Pacific Islander, 0.6% were Some Other Race, and 2.0% were two or more races. 2.8% of the population were of Hispanic or Latino ancestry.

At the 2000 census there were 1,823 people, 637 households, and 503 families living in the CDP. The population density was 913.2 people per square mile (351.9/km2). There were 662 housing units at an average density of 331.6/sq mi (127.8/km2).  The racial makeup of the CDP was 94.24% White, 3.18% African American, 0.16% Native American, 1.37% Asian, 0.44% from other races, and 0.60% from two or more races. Hispanic or Latino of any race were 1.15%.

There were 637 households, 38.6% had children under the age of 18 living with them, 69.5% were married couples living together, 6.4% had a female householder with no husband present, and 20.9% were non-families. 15.7% of households were made up of individuals, and 6.6% were one person aged 65 or older. The average household size was 2.86 and the average family size was 3.24.

The age distribution was 28.3% under the age of 18, 6.5% from 18 to 24, 31.3% from 25 to 44, 22.7% from 45 to 64, and 11.3% 65 or older. The median age was 36 years. For every 100 females, there were 95.6 males. For every 100 females age 18 and over, there were 91.8 males.

The median household income was $56,369 and the median family income  was $66,875. Males had a median income of $45,172 versus $31,402 for females. The per capita income for the CDP was $24,023. About 1.1% of families and 1.1% of the population were below the poverty line, including 1.4% of those under age 18 and none of those age 65 or over.

References

Census-designated places in Montgomery County, Pennsylvania
Census-designated places in Pennsylvania